Malenella is a genus of South American tangled nest spiders containing the single species, Malenella nana. It was  first described by M. J. Ramírez in 1995, and has only been found in Chile. This genus was named in honour of María Elena Galiano.

References

External links

Amaurobiidae
Monotypic Araneomorphae genera
Spiders of South America
Endemic fauna of Chile